The 42nd Regiment Indiana Infantry was an infantry regiment that served in the Union Army during the American Civil War.

Service
The 42nd Indiana Infantry was organized at Evansville, Indiana and mustered in for a three-year enlistment on October 9, 1861, under the command of Colonel James Garrard Jones.  The regiment was recruited in Daviess, Gibson, Pike, Spencer, Warrick, and Vanderburgh counties.

The regiment was attached to 14th Brigade, Army of the Ohio, October to December 1861. 14th Brigade, 5th Division, Army of the Ohio, to April 1862. 17th Brigade, 3rd Division, Army of the Ohio, to September 1862. 17th Brigade, 3rd Division, I Corps, Army of the Ohio, to November 1862. 2nd Brigade, 1st Division, Center, XIV Corps, Army of the Cumberland, to January 1863. 2nd Brigade, 1st Division, XIV Corps, Army of the Cumberland, to April 1863. 1st Brigade, 2nd Division, XIV Corps to October 1863. 1st Brigade, 1st Division, XIV Corps, to July 1865.

The 42nd Indiana Infantry mustered out of service at Louisville, Kentucky on July 21, 1865.

Detailed service

1862
January - February - Ordered to Kentucky, and duty at Henderson, Calhoun and Owensboro, Kentucky

February 10-25 - Advance on Nashville, Tennessee

March 28-April 11 - Occupation of Shelbyville and Fayetteville and advance on Huntsville, Alabama 

April 11–14 - Alabama 

April 11 -Action at Wartrace  

April 29 - Advance on and capture of Decatur, Alabama

August 27-September 26 - Action at West Bridge near Bridgeport 

until August - Duty at Huntsville, Alabama.March to Nashville, Tennessee, then to Louisville, Kentucky, in pursuit of Bragg, 

October 1–15 - Pursuit of Bragg into Kentucky 

October 8 - Battle of Perryville 

October 16-November 7 - March to Nashville, Tennessee 

until December 26 - Duty in Nashville, Tennessee

December 26–30 - Advance on Murfreesboro 

December 30–31 - Battle of Stones River

1863
January 1–3 - Battle of Stones River 

March 9–14 - Duty at Murfreesboro until June. Reconnaissance to Versailles 

June 23-July 7 - Tullahoma Campaign 

until August 16 - Elm River 

June 29  -  Occupation of middle Tennessee 

August 16-September 22 - Passage of the Cumberland Mountains and Tennessee River and Chickamauga Campaign 

September 11 - Davis Cross Roads or Dug Gap 

September 19–21 - Battle of Chickamauga 

September 21 - Rossville Gap 

September 24-November 23 - Siege of Chattanooga 

November 23–27 - Chattanooga-Ringgold Campaign 

November 23–24 - Lookout Mountain 

November 25 - Missionary Ridge 

November 26 - Pea Vine Creek and Graysville 

November 27 - Ringgold Gap, Taylor's Ridge

1864
January 1, 1864 - Regiment reenlisted 

May 1-September 8 - Atlanta Campaign 

May 8–11 - Demonstrations on Rocky Faced Ridge 

May 8–9 - Buzzard's Roost Gap 

May 14–15 - Battle of Resaca 

May 18–25 - Advance on Dallas 

May 25-June 5 - Operations on Pumpkin Vine Creek and battles about Dallas, New Hope Church, and Allatoona Hills 

May 27 - Pickett's Mill 

June 10-July 2 - Operations about Marietta and against Kennesaw Mountain 

June 11–14 - Pine Hill 

June 15–17 - Lost Mountain 

June 27 - Assault on Kennesaw 

July 4 - Ruff's Station, Smyrna Camp Ground 

July 5–17 - Chattahoochee River 

July 18 - Buckhead, Nancy's Creek 

July 19–20 - Peachtree Creek 

July 22-August 25 - Siege of Atlanta 

August 5–7 - Utoy Creek 

August 25–30 - Flank movement on Jonesboro 

August 29 - Near Red Oak 

August 31-September 1 - Battle of Jonesboro 

September 29-November 3 - Operations against Hood in northern Georgia and northern Alabama 

November 15-December 10 - March to the Sea  

December 10–21 - Siege of Savannah

1865

January to April - Campaign of the Carolinas 

March 16 - Averysboro, North Carolina 

March 19–21 - Battle of Bentonville 

March 24 - Occupation of Goldsboro 

April 10–14 - Advance on Raleigh 

April 14 - Occupation of Raleigh 

April 26 - Bennett's House 

April 29-May 19 - Surrender of Johnston and his army. March to Washington, D.C., via Richmond, Virginia 

May 24 - Grand Review of the Armies 

June - Moved to Louisville, Kentucky

Casualties
The regiment lost a total of 310 men during service; 5 officers and 108 enlisted men killed or mortally wounded, 1 officer and 196 enlisted men died of disease.

Commanders
 Colonel James Garrard Jones
 Colonel William T. B. McIntire - commanded at the Battle of Chickamauga as lieutenant colonel
 Colonel Gideon R. Kellams
 Lieutenant Colonel Charles Harvey Denby - second-in-command from inception through the Battle of Perryville; then assumed command of 80th Indiana Infantry Regiment
 Lieutenant Colonel James M. Shanklin - commanded at the Battle of Stones River but was captured during the battle

See also

 List of Indiana Civil War regiments
 Indiana in the Civil War

References
 Dyer, Frederick H. A Compendium of the War of the Rebellion (Des Moines, IA: Dyer Pub. Co.), 1908.
 Horral, Spillard F. History of the Forty-second Indiana Volunteer Infantry (Chicago: Donohue & Henneberry, Printers), 1892.
 Kirkpatrick, George Morgan. The Experiences of a Private Soldier of the Civil War (Indianapolis: Hoosier Bookshop), 1973. [written in 1924]
 Shanklin, James Maynard. "Dearest Lizzie": The Civil War as Seen Through the Eyes of Lieutenant Colonel James Maynard Shanklin of Southwest Indiana's own 42nd Regiment, Indiana Volunteer Infantry (Evansville, IN: Friends of Willard Library Press), 1988.  
Attribution

External links
 Rosters, history, photos, and biographies of the 42nd Indiana Infantry (Archived 2009-10-22)

Military units and formations established in 1861
Military units and formations disestablished in 1865
Units and formations of the Union Army from Indiana
1861 establishments in Indiana